Paluzzo Paluzzi Altieri degli Albertoni (8 June 1623 – 29 June 1698) was an Italian Catholic Cardinal and Cardinal-Nephew to Pope Clement X.

Biography

Altieri was born Paluzzo Paluzzi degli Albertoni in Rome, the eldest of two sons to Antonio Paluzzi degli Albertoni (second Marquis of Rasina) and Laura Carpegna. He studied at the University of Perugia and earned a doctorate of law. Thereafter he became a cleric of the Apostolic Chamber during the final part of the pontificate of Pope Urban VIII and during the pontificate of Pope Innocent X. He became Auditor-General of the Apostolic Chamber during the pontificate of Pope Alexander VII.

In 1664, Altieri was elevated to Cardinal in pectore by Pope Alexander VII. His elevation to cardinal was published in 1666 and he was made Cardinal-Priest of Santi Apostoli, Rome. The following month he was elected Bishop of Montefiascone e Corneto and consecrated by his mother's relative, Cardinal Ulderico Carpegna. He participated in the conclave of 1667 which elected Pope Clement IX.

Over the following few years he became a close advisor to Cardinal Emilio Altieri. At the papal conclave of 1669–1670 Altieri was elected as Pope Clement X. On the day of his election, since there were no more male descendants in the Altieri family, he adopted Paluzzo and he changed his name to Paluzzo Paluzzi Altieri degli Albertoni in honour of his new adoptive uncle. Thereafter he became Clement's Cardinal-Nephew. In May 1670 he was appointed Bishop of Ravenna and papal legate in Avignon.

In 1671, Altieri was named Prefect of the Sacred Consulta Propaganda Fide (a position he held until his death) and was made Governor of Tivoli. That same year he was appointed Camerlengo of the Holy Roman Church and Crown-cardinal of Ireland (he held both positions until 1698).

Between 1673 and 1677 he was made legate in Urbino and during that period he was made Secretary of the Apostolic Briefs, resigned the diocese of Ravenna and, when Pope Clement died, he participated in the conclave of 1676 which elected Pope Innocent XI.

Altieri was appointed, or appointed himself, to so many positions he was accused by his contemporaries of megalomania. Though he had established a well-regarded ecclesiastic career, his limited diplomatic experience caused problems for the Pope and for the Holy See, even after Clement's death.

Between 1678 and 1679 he was also appointed Camerlengo of the Sacred College of Cardinals (he was already Camerlengo of the Holy Roman Church).

He was appointed Cardinal-Priest of San Crisogono (1681), Cardinal-Priest of S. Maria in Trastevere (1684) and then Cardinal-Bishop of Sabina in 1689 before participating in the conclave of 1689 which elected Pope Alexander VIII. He participated in the conclave of 1691 which elected Pope Innocent XII and was thereafter appointed Cardinal-Bishop of Palestrina.
He was made Archpriest of the Patriarchal Lateran Basilica in 1693 and Bishop of Porto e Santa Rufina and Sub-Dean of the College of Cardinals in January 1698.

Six months later, on 29 June 1698, he died suddenly at his dinner table. He was waked in the Church of Santa Maria in Campitelli and buried in the chapel of St. John the Baptist which he had commissioned at the church.

Episcopal succession
Ulderico Carpegna consecrated Altieri to the episcopacy on 2 May 1666. Having himself consecrated Pope Benedict XIII to the episcopacy, Cardinal Altieri is in the episcopal lineage of Pope Francis.

Episcopal succession

References

1623 births
1698 deaths
Clergy from Rome
University of Perugia alumni
17th-century Italian cardinals
Cardinals created by Pope Alexander VII
Cardinal Vicars
Cardinal-bishops of Sabina
Members of the Congregation for the Evangelization of Peoples
Camerlengos of the Holy Roman Church
Cardinal-bishops of Palestrina
Cardinal-nephews
Burials at Santa Maria in Campitelli
Bishops of Montefiascone
Bishops of Ravenna
17th-century Italian Roman Catholic archbishops